HU-210 is a synthetic cannabinoid that was first synthesized in 1988 from (1R,5S)-myrtenol by a group led by Raphael Mechoulam at the Hebrew University. HU-210 is 100 to 800 times more potent than natural THC from cannabis and has an extended duration of action. HU-210 has a binding affinity of 0.061nM at CB1 and 0.52nM at CB2 in cloned human cannabinoid receptors compared to Delta-9-THC of 40.7nM at CB1.   HU-210 is the (–)-1,1-dimethylheptyl analog of 11-hydroxy- Δ8-  tetrahydrocannabinol; in some references it is called 1,1-dimethylheptyl- 11-hydroxytetrahydrocannabinol. The abbreviation "HU" stands for Hebrew University.

Effects and research

HU-210, the (–) enantiomer of 11-OH-D8-THC-DMH, has almost all of the cannabinoid activity, while the (+) enantiomer, known as HU-211, is inactive as a cannabinoid and instead acts as an NMDA antagonist having neuroprotective effects.

HU-210 promotes proliferation, but not differentiation, of cultured embryonic hippocampal neural stem and progenitor cells likely via a sequential activation of CB1 receptors, Gi/o proteins, and ERK signaling. It was also indicated by this increased neural growth to entail antianxiety and antidepressant effects.

HU-210, alongside other synthetic cannabinoids like WIN 55,212-2 and JWH-133, is implicated in preventing the inflammation caused by amyloid beta proteins involved in Alzheimer's disease, in addition to preventing cognitive impairment and loss of neuronal markers. This anti-inflammatory action is induced through the activation of cannabinoid receptors, which prevents microglial activation that elicits the inflammation. In addition, cannabinoids completely abolish neurotoxicity related to microglia activation in rat models.

HU-210 is a potent analgesic with many of the same effects as natural THC.

HU-210 has an oral LD50 of 5,000mg/kg in rats and 14,200mg/kg in rabbits. HU-210 has an LDLO (Lowest Lethal Dose amount) of 143mg/kg in humans. Caffeine has an LD50 estimated to be 150–200 milligrams per kilogram.  Delta-8-THC LD50 has not been confirmed. In a 1973 study monkeys and dogs given 9,000mg/kg of Delta-8-THC was nonlethal.

Chemistry

HU-210 is the enantiomer of HU-211 (Dexanabinol). The original synthesis of HU-210 is based on an acid-catalyzed condensation of (–)-Myrtenol and 1,1-Dimethylheptylresorcinol (3,5-Dihydroxy-1-(1,1-dimethylheptyl)benzol).

Legal status
HU-210 is not listed in the schedules set out by the United Nations' Single Convention on Narcotic Drugs from 1961 nor their Convention on Psychotropic Substances from 1971, so the signatory countries to these international drug control treaties are not required by said treaties to control HU-210.

New Zealand
HU-210 is banned in New Zealand as of 8 May 2014.

United States
HU-210 is not listed in the list of scheduled controlled substances in the USA. It is therefore not scheduled at the federal level in the United States, but it is possible that HU-210 could legally be considered an analog of Delta-9-THC (which is one of the substances controlled in Schedule I as "tetrahydrocannabinols"), and therefore sales or possession could potentially be prosecuted under the Federal Analogue Act. A brief profile of HU-210 written and published by the Drug Enforcement Administration (DEA) in 2009 (but subsequently removed from the DEA's website several years later) stated that HU-210 is a Schedule I controlled substance under the Controlled Substances Act due to being similar to THC. This indicates that the DEA might legally consider HU-210 to be an analogue of Delta-8-THC for the purposes of applying the Federal Analog Act to those that handle HU-210. An elucidation of the rationale for the DEA's claim was not presented, no references were cited, and the claim was eventually removed from the DEA's website. A version of the document (updated in 2013), now in PDF form, exists on the DEA Office of Diversion Control's website. Claimed in this possibly misleading though definitive sounding document, with the same lack of detailed explanation or citation, is:

Alabama
HU-210 is a Schedule I controlled substance in Alabama.

Florida
HU-210 is a Schedule I controlled substance, categorized as a hallucinogen, making it illegal to buy, sell, or possess in the state of Florida without a license.

Vermont
Effective January 1, 2016, HU-210 is a regulated drug in Vermont designated as a "Hallucinogenic Drug."

Other HU Cannabinoids

 HU-211
 HU-239
 HU-243
 HU-308
 HU-320
 HU-331
 HU-336
 HU-345

See also 
 11-Hydroxy-Delta-8-THC
 CP 47,497
 JWH-018

References

Further reading 

 
 

Primary alcohols
Benzochromenes
HU cannabinoids
Designer drugs
Phenols